Khwaja Khurshid Anwar (21 March 1912 − 30 October 1984) was a Pakistani filmmaker, writer, director and music composer who earned recognition in both India and Pakistan. He is credited as being one of the most original and inventive music directors of his generation. He was the Programme Producer (Music) at (AIR), All India Radio or Akashvani (radio broadcaster), Delhi in 1939.

Early life
Khwaja Khurshid Anwar was born on 21 March 1912 in Mianwali, Punjab (now in Pakistan) where his maternal grandfather Khan Bahadur Dr.Sheikh Atta Mohammad (whose eldest daughter was married to philosopher-poet Muhammad Iqbal, to whom he was thus a nephew) was serving as civil surgeon. His father Khwaja Ferozuddin Ahmad was a well-known Barrister settled in Lahore, Pakistan. The ace jurist had a love for music so much so that he had a huge collection of gramophone records of Indian classical and neo-classical music and his precocious son had an unhindered access to them all. Moreover, in the weekly music performances held in the lawyer's home, renowned music masters used to perform, and it was here that the young Khurshid Anwar developed a taste for classical music. Considering Khrshid Anwar's keen interest, Khansahib Tawakkal Hussain agreed to take him as his disciple and train him in 1934.

Khurshid Anwar was also a brilliant student at Government College, Lahore, the renowned seat of learning at that time. Having topped in the master's degree in Philosophy in (1935), he appeared in the examination for Indian Civil Service (ICS) but due to his political and anti-British Raj activities, the British colonial masters did not like his activities. He was also absent from the prize-distribution ceremony of the Punjab University held to honour the students with distinctions. When his name was called to receive the Gold Medal in Philosophy, nobody turned up. The British Chancellor of the University who was awarding medals remarked that the student having forgotten to receive the medal, is a true philosopher.

Career in India
In 1939, Khurshid Anwar joined AIR All India Radio or (Akashvani (radio broadcaster)), Delhi as Programme Producer (Music). It was from here that he acceded to the requests of Abdur Rashid Kardar, the renowned film producer, to join Bombay film world as a music director. He made his debut as a music director in Kardar's Punjabi venture "Kurmai" (1941). His first Hindi film was "Ishara"(1943].  The film gained much popularity from its songs which included "Panghat pe muraliya baje" by Suraiya, "Shabnam kyon neer bahaye" Sung by Gauhar Sultan, and "Dil deke dagha nahin dena" by Vatsala Kumathekar. Some of his other Hindi films were Parakh (1944, with Saraswati Devi), Yateem (1945), Aaj Aur Kal (1947), Pagdandi (1947), and Parwaana (1947) which was the last movie in which K. L. Saigal acted and sang in.

For "Singaar" (1949) he got the Clare Award for Best Music Director. His later films "Nishaana" (1950) and "Neelam Pari" (1952) added new feathers to his cap. He remained an inspiration to many later day music directors in both India and Pakistan. For many years, renowned Indian film music director Roshan was a disciple of his, as was Shankar of Shankar Jaikishan fame. He was regularly praised by his contemporary Indian film music director Naushad Ali, who considered him to be one of the finest film composers in the subcontinent.

Filmography

Writer
Hamraz      :  Story, Screenplay and Dialogues (1967)
Chingari    :  Story and Screenplay           (1964)
Ghunghat    :  Story and Screenplay (1962)
Jhoomer     :  Story and Screenplay           (1959)
Zehr-e-Ishq :  Story and Screenplay           (1958)
Intezar     :  Story and Screenplay           (1956)

Director
 Ghunghat             (1962)
 Chingari                                      (1964)
 Hamraz                                        (1967)

Producer
Hamraz           (co-Producer) (1967)
Chingari        (co-Producer)  (1964)
Ghunghat  (co-Producer) (1962)
Jhoomer         (Producer) (1959)
Zehr-E-Ishq     (co-Producer) (1958)
Intezar         (co-Producer) (1956)

Music director in India
1.  Kurmai (Punjabi) (1941)
2.  Ishara                             (1943)
3. Parakh (1944 film)             (1944)
4. Yateem                         (1945)
5. Parwana (1947 film)            (1947)
6.  Paghdandi                          (1947)
7.  Aaj Aur Kal (1947)
8.  Singhar (1949)
9.  Nishana (1950)
10. Neelam Pari (1952)

Music director in Pakistani films
1. Intezar (1956)
2. Mirza Sahiban (1956)
3.	Zehr-E-Ishq (1958)
4. Jhoomer (1959)
5.	Koel (1959)
6.	Ayaz (1960)
7. Ghunghat (1962)
8.	Chingari (1964)
9. Haveli (1964)
10. Sarhad (1966)
11. Hamraaz (1967)
12. Guddo (Punjabi) (1970)
13. Heer Ranjha (Punjabi)  (1970)
14. Parai Aag              (1971)
15. Salam-e-Mohabbat       (1971)
16. Shirin Farhad          (1975)
17. Haider Ali              (1978)
18. Mirza Jat (Punjabi)    (1982)

Some of his popular songs
 "Paapi papeeha ray pee pee na bol bairi" Sung by Suraiya, lyrics by D. N. Madhok, film Parwana
 "Jab tum hi nahin apne dunya hi begaani hai" Sung by Suraiya, lyrics by D. N. Madhok, film Parwana
 "Jis din say piya dil lay gaey, dukh dey gaey, chaen nahin aaey" Sung by Noor Jehan, lyrics by Qateel Shifai, film Intezar (1956)
 "Chali re chali re, barri aas laga kay chali re" Sung by Nahid Niazi, lyrics by Tanvir Naqvi, film Jhoomer (1959)
 "Rim Jhim Rhim Jhim Parray Phuwaar, Tera Mera Nit Ka Pyaar" Sung by Noor Jehan and Munir Hussain, lyrics by Tanvir Naqvi, film Koel (1959)
 "Suno arz meri kamli waalay" Sung by Zubaida Khanum, lyrics by Qateel Shifai, film Zehr-E-Ishq (1958)
 "Sallu alahi-e-wa-alle-hee, jo na hota tera jamal hee" Sung by Zubaida Khanum,Kausar Parveen, lyrics by Tanvir Naqvi, film Ayaz (1960)
 Ae Roshanion Kay Shehar Bata Sung by Mehdi Hassan, lyrics by Tanvir Naqvi, film Chingari (1964)

Death and legacy
Khurshid Anwar died on 30 October 1984 in Lahore after a protracted illness and was laid to rest at Miani Sahib Graveyard. In recognition of his contribution in enrichment of film music, the Bollywood film industry awarded him the coveted Mortal-Men-Immortal-Melodies Award (1982). Great Urdu poet of 20th century, Faiz Ahmad Faiz  was a lifelong friend of Khurshid Anwar. During an interview, in reply to a query of Anwar Maqsood, Faiz acknowledged that he was inspired by Khurshid Anwar.

He has also been praised for his efforts to keep alive classical music not only through his compositions but also through his unique collection of classical music (considered his magnum opus) performances recorded by EMI Pakistan, known as Aahang-e-Khusravi in two parts in 1978. Raag Mala has ten audio cassettes that include 90 Raags in ten Thaths. Each Raag has a short introduction in the voice of Khurshid Anwar explaining the characteristics of the Raag followed by its audio performance by renowned classical singers of Pakistan. The second part of Aahang-e-Khusravi is Gharanon Ki Gaiyki on 20 audio cassettes which consists of audio recordings of representatives of the main Gharanas of classical singers in Pakistan. In recognition of his services for the cause of music, he was awarded the coveted Sitara-e-Imtiaz award by the Government of Pakistan in 1980. His activity in 1976 was to pay tributes to a historical music legend Amir Khusro (1253 A.D.-1325 A.D.) on the occasion of this music innovator's 700th Birth Anniversary Celebrations in Pakistan. The above-mentioned music recordings by EMI Pakistan and the accompanying book on the history of music by Khurshid Anwar were all part of those celebrations.

Awards and recognition
Sitara-e-Imtiaz (Star of Excellence) Award by the President of Pakistan in 1980
 3 Nigar Awards for Best Music in film Zehr-e-Ishq (1958), film Ghunghat (1962 film) and Punjabi language film Heer Ranjha (1970)
Mortal-Men-Immortal-Melodies Award in 1982 in India

References

External links
 , Filmography of Khwaja Khurshid Anwar

1912 births
1984 deaths
Pakistani composers
Recipients of Sitara-i-Imtiaz
Nigar Award winners
Film directors from Lahore
Government College University, Lahore alumni
Pakistani screenwriters
Pakistani film producers
Pakistani film score composers
Pakistani music video directors
Writers from Lahore
Musicians from Lahore
20th-century composers
Pakistani musicologists
Punjabi people
20th-century musicologists
20th-century screenwriters
People from Lahore